Shizuya Hayashi (November 28, 1917 – March 12, 2008) was a soldier in the 100th Infantry Battalion of the United States Army.  He received the Medal of Honor for actions in Cerasuolo, Italy during World War II.

Early life
Hayashi was born in Waialua, Hawaii. He is the son of immigrants who were born in Japan. He is a Nisei, which means that he is a second generation Japanese-American.

Soldier
Nine months before the Japanese attack on Pearl Harbor, Hayashi was drafted into the US Army in March 1941. He was given the nickname "Cesar" because his sergeant could not pronounce his name.

Hayashi volunteered to be part of the all-Nisei 100th Infantry Battalion.   This army unit was mostly made up of Japanese Americans from Hawaii and the mainland.

For his actions in November 1943, Hayashi was awarded the Army's second-highest decoration, the Distinguished Service Cross.

Medal of Honor citation
Hayashi's Medal of Honor recognized his conduct in frontline fighting in central Italy in 1943.

He distinguished himself by taking over a German position despite superior numbers. Hayashi was originally awarded the Distinguished Service Cross which was upgraded to the Medal of Honor upon military review in June 2000. The review was conducted on the belief that racial discrimination prevented Hayashi and several other soldiers of Asian descent from being awarded the United States' highest decoration for valor. Twenty one other soldiers also received the Medal based on the review. Hayashi was one of 12 who were still alive when the Medal was eventually awarded. Since being recognized with the Medal, Hayashi has been a guest speaker at various events including being an honored guest at the United States Army Southern European Task Force.

Private Shizuya Hayashi distinguished himself by extraordinary heroism in action on 29 November 1943, near Cerasuolo, Italy. During a flank assault on high ground held by the enemy, Private Hayashi rose alone in the face of grenade, rifle, and machine gun fire. Firing his automatic rifle from the hip, he charged and overtook an enemy machine gun position, killing seven men in the nest and two more as they fled. After his platoon advanced 200 yards from this point, an enemy antiaircraft gun opened fire on the men. Private Hayashi returned fire at the hostile position, killing nine of the enemy, taking four prisoners, and forcing the remainder of the force to withdraw from the hill. Private Hayashi's extraordinary heroism and devotion to duty are in keeping with the highest traditions of military service and reflect great credit on him, his unit, and the United States Army.

See also
List of Asian American Medal of Honor recipients
List of Medal of Honor recipients for World War II
442nd Regimental Combat Team

References

External links
 "Army Secretary Lionizes 22 World War II Heroes" at Defense.gov
 

1917 births
2008 deaths
United States Army personnel of World War II
United States Army Medal of Honor recipients
American military personnel of Japanese descent
United States Army soldiers
People from Hawaii
Recipients of the Distinguished Service Cross (United States)
World War II recipients of the Medal of Honor
Burials in the National Memorial Cemetery of the Pacific